Richter Peaks is a group of peaks rising to about 1,385 m located near the southern extremity of the Walton Mountains, situated in the central portion of Alexander Island, Antarctica. The peaks were named by Advisory Committee on Antarctic Names for Joseph J. Richter, United States Antarctic Research Program biologist, Palmer Station, 1965–66 and 1966–67.

See also

 Landers Peaks
 Mussorgsky Peaks
 Staccato Peaks
 

Mountains of Alexander Island